Timothy Alan Reuter (25 January 1947 – 14 October 2002), grandson of the former mayor of Berlin Ernst Reuter, was a German-British historian who specialized in the study of medieval Germany, particularly the social, military and ecclesiastical institutions of the Ottonian and Salian periods (10th–12th centuries).

Reuter received his D.Phil. from Oxford in medieval history under the supervision of Karl Leyser (d. 1992), another leading Anglophone scholar of German history. After a brief stint lecturing at the University of Exeter, Reuter spent more than a decade as a Mitarbeiter (academic staff member) at the Monumenta Germaniae Historica in Munich, where he worked on editing the letters of the twelfth-century abbot Wibald of Corvey and (with Dr. Gabriel Silagi) produced the database for a concordance to the work of the medieval canonist Gratian.

In 1994, Reuter was appointed to a professorship at the University of Southampton, where he remained until his death in 2002. At Southampton, he headed a number of educational and research initiatives that promoted medieval history and scholarship.

In addition Reuter served as a liaison between the worlds of Anglo-American and German medieval studies. Among his contributions in this area were numerous book reviews in German and British publications, a translation of Gerd Tellenbach's monograph on the history of the church in the High Middle Ages (The Church in Western Europe from the tenth to the early twelfth century, Cambridge, 1993) and the posthumous editing and publishing of his mentor Karl Leyser's papers (Communications and Power in Medieval Europe, 2 vols., Hambledon & London, 1992). His own monograph, Germany in the Early Middle Ages, 800-1056 (Harlow, Essex & New York, 1991) remains a standard English-language survey of the subject.

At the time of his death of brain cancer, Reuter was working on a history of the medieval episcopacy.  His collected papers are posthumously published as Medieval Polities and Modern Mentalities (Cambridge, 2006).

The collection Challenging the Boundaries of Medieval History: The Legacy of Timothy Reuter, edited by Patricia Skinner, was published in 2009 as volume 22 in the University of York Studies in the Early Middle Ages (Brepols, Turnhout, Belgium).

Main works

References

External links 
Obituary for Timothy Reuter by fellow-medievalist Janet L. Nelson

1947 births
2002 deaths
Academics of the University of Southampton
20th-century German historians
German male non-fiction writers
20th-century British historians